The sixth competition weekend of the 2015–16 ISU Speed Skating World Cup was held in the Thialf arena in Heerenveen, Netherlands, from Friday, 11 March, until Sunday, 13 March 2016.

Schedule
The detailed schedule of events:

All times are CET (UTC+1).

Medal summary

Men's events

 In mass start, race points are accumulated during the race. The skater with most race points is the winner.

Women's events

 In mass start, race points are accumulated during the race. The skater with most race points is the winner.

References

 
6
Isu World Cup, 2015-16, 6
ISU Speed Skating World Cup, 2015-16, World Cup 6